Ernest Stanley Salmon (1 June 1871 – 12 October 1959) was a British mycologist and plant pathologist best known for his work in breeding new varieties of hops. Salmon crossed a wild Manitoban hop with cultivated English stock to create hybrid C9a, which was released to commercial cultivation in 1934 as Brewer's Gold. Though the original wild hop died during the winter of 1918–19, Brewer's Gold has become the ancestor of nearly every new high-alpha hop variety released since then.

Salmon was born in Richmond, Surrey, England, in 1871 and held a number of research and teaching positions through his life. He was a researcher at the Kew Gardens from 1899 to 1906 and at Wye College from 1906 to 1937. Salmon was elected as the president of the British Mycological Society in 1911, he was appointed as a reader in mycology at London University in 1912 and was promoted to a full professorship there in 1925.

As his obituaries noted, Salmon was an excellent tennis player.  He reached the Wimbledon men's singles quarter final in 1903.  Salmon lived for most of his life in the village of Wye. He died in a Folkestone nursing home on October 12, 1959.

Disease research

Though he is remembered today as a breeder of hops, Salmon's career started as a mycologist and plant pathologist with the Jodrell Laboratory, Kew in 1899. He specialized in the study of powdery mildew, a fungus which commonly afflicts food cops, is a particular issue for hops, and for which there was no widely known treatment at the time.

In 1906, Salmon moved to the South Eastern Agricultural College at Wye (part of London University commonly referred to as Wye College) to continue his research into the fungal pathology affecting various food crops, including hops. While there, he began to investigate the hybridization of hops under the College's new hop breeding program, with an eye first towards creating new varieties resistant to diseases affecting the plant.

Salmon's research into the diseases of hops, and recommendations to growers on prevention and treatment, continued for much of his career.

Breeding programme

Until about 1900, there were no large scale, scientific attempts to cultivate new varieties of hops. There were some known varieties, but they were identified primarily by geography and gross differences in the plants' characteristics. While hops were propagated by root cuttings, "cloning" certain genomes, little effort was expended in preserving specific strains or in producing new, high quality cultivars. On top of this, crop yield was highly variable from year to year, due to the effects of disease, pests, and rainfall. Farmers would experience a full crop yield perhaps once in a decade, leading to overplanting, which in turn caused large variances in the supply and price of hops between good and bad harvests. Wye College started a hop cultivation program in 1904 to address this issue by applying new principles of plant breeding to the crop. By 1917, Salmon and Wye had partnered with the East Malling Research Station to grow hops on a larger scale, in order to evaluate the commercial properties of promising crosses.

Salmon's first goal for the hop breeding programme, as an extension of his research in plant pathology, was to develop disease-resistant strains. Through Salmon's career, hops were known to be a bittering agent, but research and interest in hops, particularly those originating in the Americas, was around the preservative value of the hops, the source of that value, and methods of measurement.  Despite this value, brewers generally regarded American-grown hops as inferior, because of their higher levels of bitterness and particularly because of aromas considered unpleasant at the time. Salmon noted early on that English brewers were forced to blend in American-grown hops for their higher preservative value, despite this inferiority, and his breeding research expanded to include this criteria.

As his research was directed toward commercial exploitation of hops, the published summaries generally included the parentage of each variety, comparative crop yield, resistance to common diseases, "resins-contents" (α- and β-acids), and particularly the results of commercial brewing trials with promising strains.

Methodology

It can take a decade or more to bring a single variety from first breeding to full scale farming and some of Salmon's hops took far longer than this to see commercial use. Brewer's Gold was first planted in 1919, but not released until 1934, nearly two decades later.  Cross OZ97a was first bred in 1921, did not reach farm trials until 1957, and it has only been released for commercial cultivation as of 2014.

At the time Salmon began his research, the accepted method for breeding hops was to simply cross the best representatives of a given variety. Recognizing that he could only make incremental improvements to a cultivar in that way, Salmon decided to inject new breeding material into the existing English stock. He collected hops from the United States, Canada and continental Europe and began crossing them with traditional English varieties.

Because of the hit-or-miss nature of finding valuable new varieties, Salmon's procedure was to cross hundreds or thousands of plants each year. By 1930, he said he had grown more than 10,000 seedlings. Some crosses, particularly early in the program, were by open pollination. Later, to select for specific characteristics, field workers would bag each cluster of cones before the female bines flowered, to protect them from wild pollination. They would then apply pollen from a selected male plant to the flower with a paint brush and reseal the bag. Once seeds had formed, the bags could be removed. The seeds would then be planted the following year and evaluation of the new cross could begin the year after that.

To identify individual plants, Salmon assigned a sequential letter (and later, pairs of letters) to each row garden and a number to each hill in the row. If a plant was later replaced, a lower case letter was appended. For example, cross C9a was in the third row, ninth hill, and was the second seed planted in that location. Once a likely candidate had been identified and grown to a scale useful in brewing at East Malling, Salmon and his colleagues would submit it to several brewers for trials "in copper." Following a successful brewing trial, the hops would be released to selected farmers for commercial growing trials before being released. A significant portion of his reports each year were dedicated to these commercial brewing and growing tests.

Awards

Horace Brown Medal, 1955

Varieties introduced by Salmon

Salmon was instrumental in introducing numerous new hop varieties to British commercial cultivation. Brewer's Gold was the seminal hop bred by Salmon and is ancestor to most of the high-alpha hops released since that time. Its seed was planted by Salmon in 1919 from the cross of a wild female hop collected in Manitoba (grown at Wye and identified as BB1) with an English male hop. Brewer's Gold was his first commercial release, introduced in 1934, nearly three decades after he started his research at Wye College. The bulk of his releases occurred in the 1940s, as brewer interest in the "New Varieties" grew and many brewing trials of the hops originating at Wye took place.

Notes

References

Primary sources

External links

English mycologists
British Mycological Society
1871 births
1959 deaths
English male tennis players
People from Wye, Kent
British male tennis players
Academics of Wye College